Barefoot is the state of not wearing any footwear. 

There are health benefits and some risks associated with going barefoot. Shoes, while they offer protection, can limit the flexibility, strength, and mobility of the foot and can lead to higher incidences of flexible flat foot, bunions, hammer toe, and Morton's neuroma. Walking and running barefoot results in a more natural gait, allowing for a more rocking motion of the foot, eliminating the hard heel strike and generating less collision force in the foot and lower leg.

There are many sports that are performed barefoot, most notably gymnastics and martial arts, but also beach volleyball, swimming, barefoot running, barefoot hiking, and water skiing.

Historical and religious aspects

Athletes in the Ancient Olympic Games participated barefoot and generally unclothed.

The Romans, who eventually conquered the Greeks and adopted many aspects of their culture, did not adopt the Greek perception of footwear and clothing. Roman clothing explicitly included footwear was seen as a sign of power and as a necessity of living in a civilized world; accordingly slaves usually were to remain barefoot.

During the Middle Ages, going barefoot was seen as a mark of poverty and the lowest social class, as well as being the mark of a prisoner.

The phrase barefoot and pregnant is now used to illustrate a woman's traditional role as a homemaker and thus her lack of opportunities to socialize or to have a career outside of the home. It was first used in the early 20th century

Religious aspects
In most religions, the exposure of bare feet is regarded as a sign of humility and subjection. Some religious practitioners have taken a vow of Gospel poverty, while there are certain convents where going barefoot is obligatory (Convent of Las Descalzas Reales, Poor Clares, Colettine Poor Clares). Going barefoot generally symbolizes poverty. It is customary in Judaism and some Christian denominations to go barefoot while mourning. Some Christian churches practice barefoot pilgrimage traditions, such as the ascent of Croagh Patrick in Ireland at night while barefoot.

In many religions, it is common to remove shoes when entering a place considered holy. For example, in the Book of Exodus, Moses was instructed to remove his shoes before approaching the burning bush:

Anyone entering a mosque or a Hindu temple, including a visitor, is expected to remove his or her shoes; racks for the storage of shoes are usually provided at the entrance.

Foot washing, or ceremonial washing of others' feet, is associated with humility in Christianity, and Jesus Christ is recorded in the New Testament as washing the feet of his disciples to serve them during the Last Supper. Christians who practice foot washing today do so to bring them closer to Jesus and to fill them with a sense of humility and service. Roman Catholics show their respect and humility for the Pope by kissing his feet. In a similar manner, Hindus show love and respect to a guru by touching his bare feet (called pranam). It is customary to show one's respect by walking barefoot around Raj Ghat, the monument to Mahatma Gandhi. Both United States President George W. Bush and Pope John Paul II paid him this honor. During the Imperial Japanese period, removing one's shoes in the presence of a person of higher status was a sign of showing one's own humility, subordination, and respect towards their status.

Christian congregations of men and women that go entirely barefoot or wear sandals include the Discalced, like the Discalced Carmelites (1568), the Feuillants (Cistercians, 1575), the Trinitarians (1594), the Mercedarians (1604), and the Passionists.

In many branches of Romani culture across the world, it is traditional for women to dance barefoot.

Barefoot customs by country

Australia
It is common for Australians, particularly young people, to be barefoot in public places, especially during summer.

Barefoot walking, known as "earthing", has been used by the Australian cricket team to "capture positive energy coming out of the earth."

India

In Indian culture, in many an instance, being barefoot has a cultural significance. For example, it is customary to remove footwear when entering a home or a temple as shoes are considered impure. Indians also traditionally sit on the floor when eating meals as opposed to at a dining table, which would normally entail taking off footwear.

New Zealand
In 2012, a travel writer for The New York Times wrote the number of New Zealanders barefoot in public, including shops was "striking". In 2014, Air New Zealand was subject of critical attention after allegedly forcing a customer to wear shoes.

South Africa
In South Africa barefoot walking in public is part of the predominantly white Afrikaans-speaking culture, although English speaking people also often walk barefoot in public, especially in the summer months and in cities such as Cape Town. The National Guidelines on School Uniform list shoes as an optional item while the Draft Guidelines state "Pupils, especially in lower grades, should also be permitted to attend without shoes in hot weather". Most children attend school barefoot. In many schools, the dress codes either encourage children to attend school barefoot or prefer children to attend school barefoot, especially in the summer months.

Some South African schools have sport uniforms where bare feet are compulsory, such as primary school rugby. Another sport where bare feet for kids are compulsory is "tou trek" or tug of war, sometimes school play and sports days barefeet are compulsory. Being barefoot in public is generally tolerated. In South African shopping malls, stores, and events, it is not an uncommon sight to see barefoot adults and children.

United States 
In some parts of the United States, taboos against barefoot walking are strong. Youngstown, Ohio, actually had an ordinance prohibiting barefooting until it was struck down as unconstitutional. However, in the early 18th to 20th century, many children in rural areas of America often went barefoot due to poverty. Many stores, restaurants, and other public venues in the United States employ dress codes prohibiting bare feet.

Slave codes
It has been a standard feature for common citizens in civil societies to wear shoes ever since ancient times. On the contrary slave codes often included that slaves had to remain barefoot as a matter of principle. For example, the Cape Town slave code stated that "Slaves must go barefoot and must carry passes". This was the case in the majority of states that abolished slavery later in history, as most images from the respective historical period suggest that slaves were barefoot. To quote Brother Riemer (1779): "[the slaves] are, even in their most beautiful suit, obliged to go barefoot. Slaves were forbidden to wear shoes. This was a prime mark of distinction between the free and the bonded and no exceptions were permitted."

Shoes have been regarded as signs of empowerment and badges of freedom since early human history. Going barefoot, on the other hand, showcased a very low social status, often being an unfree person. Using the meaning of shoes to display a respectable social status and authority, people have sometimes been issued with footwear even ceremonially. This aspect is mentioned in the Bible, the Parable of the Prodigal Son quotes: "But the father said to his servants, Bring forth the best robe, and put [it] on him; and put a ring on his hand, and shoes on [his] feet". Forcing individuals to go barefoot by taking away their footwear and preventing or banning shoes from being worn therefore has the reversed meaning. While the standard form of appearance commonly includes footwear as a standard feature, the imagery of bare feet is often used to display submission, subjugation or dependence, in certain contexts also being disarmed or disempowered.This detail has become an informal and sometimes even formal law in societies practicing slavery in present and past. A barefooted individual could be unmistakably identified as unfree and be attributed with the lowest social status at first sight, being either a slave or a prisoner. As a consequence appearing barefoot in public was strictly avoided by common citizens.In many states this perception is prevalent to this day and shoes are typically also worn in the private space while being barefoot is placed under taboo.

In societies where slavery is still unofficially practiced this rule pertains to this day. For example, the Tuareg are known still to practice slavery and force their slaves to go barefoot.

Inquisition and witch trials

During the era of the Catholic Inquisition it was a conviction that women allegedly practicing witchcraft had their ability to use their "sinister powers" largely impaired if they were barefoot. Arrested women first had their footwear taken away and it was ensured that they remained barefoot at all times. Due to interpretations of the Malleus Maleficarum it was believed that in case an accused witch was not strictly kept with bare feet she could cast a spell on people by only looking at them. As the prosecutors wanted to avoid any risks, it was ensured that the bare feet of the women remained visible throughout. During questioning or in court, the accused women often had to stand within the boundaries of a consecrated spot with the soles of their bare feet constantly being in contact with the sanctified section of the ground. This was believed to inhibit any of their purported magic powers entirely. The women were prevented from even looking at the prosecutors when their feet were not strictly in place. To further ensure safety they were often led in walking backwards for their court sessions. They were not allowed to turn around until their bare feet were visibly placed within the bounded spot. As the accused women were not able use magic after all, this assumption became accepted doctrine.
Accordingly, contemporary depictions about inquisition proceedings or similar situations portray the women accused of witchcraft barefooted in almost every case.

Corporal punishment

The soles of a barefoot person also serve as a specific target for corporal punishment, commonly referred to as "bastinado" (foot whipping). This method is mainly used in the context of penal functions while the receiving person is usually held in a situation of imprisonment or custody.

The practice of foot whipping is still officially employed in several Middle Eastern nations where the term falaka is customary. This kind of beating was also frequently practiced in Western countries until the middle of the 20th century, where it is generally referred to as "Bastonade". Among others, it was common in German territories, where it was employed until the end of the Nazi-era, mainly within the reformatory and prison system. In certain facilities it continued to be used up until the 1950s.

The beatings are usually aimed at the vaults of the foot, not directly hitting the bone structure of the balls and the heels. The vaults are highly pain-sensitive due to the tight clustering of nerve tissue in that area.

As bastinado usually causes a high amount of suffering for the receiving person while physical evidence remains mostly undetectable after a certain time, it is often used for interrogation purposes in certain countries as well.

Arts and entertainment

Many singers and dancers perform on stage barefoot. The classical dance of Cambodia had its roots in the holy dances of the legendary seductresses (apsaras) of ancient Cambodia and attained its high point during the Angkor period in its interpretations of the Indian epics, especially the Ramayana. Cambodian dancers were well-born women of the king's harem and danced barefoot, with the feet turned outwards and the legs slightly bent at the knee to cushion the movements of the upper body. The unimpeded movement of the foot was essential to the art. When the land was invaded by the Thai, the dancers were taken to the Thai court, where their art was adapted and continued to flourish.

The barefoot dance movement of the early 20th century challenged the received laws of classical dance and the broader laws of social decorum. For decades, the bare foot had been perceived as obscene, and no matter how determined barefoot dancers were to validate their art with reference to spiritual, artistic, historic, and organic concepts, barefoot dancing was inextricably linked in the public mind with indecency and sexual taboo. In 1908, Maud Allan shocked and fascinated London theatre-goers with her barefoot dance of desire in Salome, and scandalous tributes positioned her as the embodiment of lust. For many, barefoot dancing represented not only the freedom and horror of modern sexuality but the progress and decline of high culture.

Californian Isadora Duncan revolutionized dance in the Western world by jettisoning the tutu and the pointe shoe of classical ballet and scandalized audiences by performing works of her own choreography in flowing draperies and bare feet. She anticipated the modern women's liberation movement by urging women to rid themselves of corsets and matrimony. Duncan divorced the bare foot from perceptions of obscenity and made a conscious effort to link barefoot dancing to ideals such as "nudity, childhood, the idyllic past, flowing lines, health, nobility, ease, freedom, simplicity, order, and harmony". She believed her utopian dance vision and program would ameliorate the perceived ills of modern life and restore the world to the imagined perfection of Ancient Greece.

The 1954 film The Barefoot Contessa tells the fictional story of Maria Vargas (portrayed by Ava Gardner), a Spanish cabaret dancer of simple origins who frequently went barefoot. She was cast in a movie by writer and director Harry Dawes (portrayed by Humphrey Bogart) and became a major star. In 1978, Ina Garten purchased a specialty food store in The Hamptons named Barefoot Contessa, after the movie. She liked the name because it went well with her simple and elegant cooking style. She sold the store in 1999 and wrote her first book, The Barefoot Contessa Cookbook, which became one of the best-selling cookbooks of the year. She would go on to write more cookbooks and, in 2002, started production of a television show on the Food Network, also named the Barefoot Contessa, which continues to run.

In the latter half of the 20th century, many singers, primarily women, have performed barefoot, a trend that continues in the early 21st century. One of the first singers to become well known for singing barefoot on stage was Sandie Shaw, who became known as the "Barefoot Pop Princess of the 1960s". Jimmy Buffett is known for performing barefoot at concerts, promoting an island/beach bum lifestyle. Cesária Évora of Cape Verde was known as the "Barefoot Diva" for her habit of performing without shoes. British singer Joss Stone is well known for performing barefoot and was referred to as a "barefoot diva" by The Guardian in 2004.

At the Coachella Valley Music and Arts Festival, some attendees go barefoot on the grass ground, sometimes for fashion. Celebrities who have gone barefoot at the festival include Vanessa Hudgens, Gigi Hadid, Ashley Benson, Alessandra Ambrosio and Isabel Lucas.

Health implications

There are risks and benefits associated with going barefoot. Footwear provides some protection from puncture wounds from glass, nails, rocks, or thorns as well as abrasions, bruises, heat burns, electrical shock, and frostbite—but studies of people who habitually walk barefoot have consistently found that these problems are minimal, with only about 0.89% of barefoot people having any kind of foot complaint linked to walking barefoot (including temporary conditions such as abrasions) or having the tops of the feet uncovered. Feet that have never worn shoes rarely exhibit problems such as bunions, corns, and "fallen arches", are not prone to more than ordinary foot eversion on standing and walking due to the associated weakness or stiffness of the joints of the foot and weakness of the muscles controlling them, as well as having a much reduced incidence of problems such as callouses.

Walking barefoot results in a more natural gait. People who are used to walking barefoot tend to land less forcefully, eliminating the hard heel strike and generating much less collision force in the foot and lower leg, allowing for a rocking motion of the foot from heel to toe. Similarly, barefoot running usually involves an initial forefoot strike, instead of on the rear of the foot, generating smaller collision forces. A 2006 study found that shoes may increase stress on the knee and ankle, and suggested that adults who walked barefoot may have a lower rate of osteoarthritis, although more study is required to elucidate the factors that distribute loads in shod and barefoot walking. A 2007 study examined 180 modern humans and compared their feet with 2,000-year-old skeletons. They concluded that, before the invention of shoes, humans overall had healthier feet. A 1991 study found that children who wore shoes were three times more likely to have flat feet than those who did not, and suggested that wearing shoes in early childhood can be detrimental to the longitudinal arch of the foot. Children who habitually go barefoot were found to have stronger feet, with better flexibility and mobility, fewer deformities like flat feet or toes that curve inwards, and fewer complaints.  

Since there is no artificial protection of the bare foot, some of the possible issues include cuts, abrasions, bruises, or puncture wounds from glass, nails, rocks, or thorns, as well as poisonous plants, animals, or parasites that can enter the body through the cuts on an injured bare foot. In people who are not habitually barefoot, athlete's foot is spread by fungal spores coming into contact with skin that has been weakened and made moist. The fungus is known to only affect around 0.75% of habitually barefoot people in one study and can be prevented by reducing shoe use and keeping the feet dry, particularly after walking through a damp environment where people communally walk barefoot as the fungus only develops under the right conditions, such as when people fail to properly dry their feet after swimming or showering and then put on shoes. Wearing shoes such as flip flops or sandals in these areas can reduce the risk. As such, the fungus is very unlikely to develop on a person who goes barefoot all the time.

The hookworm parasite, found only in warm, moist climates where human feces contaminated with hookworm larvae has been left in places where it might come into contact with human skin, can burrow through a bare human foot (or any part of the body that comes into contact with it). However, as the parasite tends to occur mainly in mud and cesspools, its spread cannot be stopped by most standard shoes since the larvae can penetrate fabric and small holes. The parasite may spread through contaminated material coming into contact with any part of the body, such as through flecks of mud splashing on an ankle or leg. The hookworm parasite is relatively mild, has few symptoms, and can pass completely unnoticed when the infestation level is low enough. Since the hookworm infection is very cheap and easy to treat, and since it requires infected feces to come into contact with human skin within a particular time period, eradicating hookworm is mainly a matter of hygiene (including the building of proper toilet and waste-disposal facilities) and mass-treatment.

In very cold weather, shoes can provide thermal insulation, protecting against frostbite.

Issues that can develop as a result of someone who has always worn shoes going barefoot include calf pain or Achilles tendinitis or plantar fasciitis due to shortening of the Achilles tendon and the foot being underdeveloped, due to regular use of shoes. A careful transition eases or removes symptoms, which quickly vanish as the foot adapts. Blisters on the feet may occur in the first few weeks of going barefoot, until the skin has become more robust. Individuals with diabetes or other conditions that affect sensation in the feet are at greater risk of injury while barefoot. The American Diabetes Association recommends that diabetics wear shoes and socks at all times.

Laws 
In the United States, there have been myths that regulations require the wearing of footwear. In the United States, during the period of the counterculture movement of the 1960s, business establishments would deny admittance to barefoot hippies arguing that health regulations required that shoes be worn. This led to a belief by many in nonexistent OSHA or local health department regulations preventing people from going to stores, restaurants, and other establishments without shoes. However, those regulations that exist apply only to employees and not customers. Specifically, the United States Occupational Safety and Health Administration requires employers to "ensure that each affected employee uses protective footwear" when there is a danger of foot injuries due to falling or rolling objects, objects piercing the sole of an employee's foot, and where an employee's feet may be exposed to electrical hazards. Additionally, employee footwear, where required by OSHA, must comply with one of the standards described in OSHA's regulations. State and local laws may dictate when and where an employee must wear shoes.

Some people speculate that driving barefoot increases the risk of an accident if bare feet slip off the pedals. It is legal throughout the United States, Canada, and the United Kingdom to drive barefoot. However, in some US jurisdictions, police officers may ticket a driver for other things if the fact that they were driving barefoot or in flip-flops/high heeled shoes hindered their driving and/or resulted in an accident. Driving barefoot may also potentially be used in the case of an accident to put the driver more at fault.

Sports and recreation

There are several recreational activities one can participate in while barefoot. Those involved in water sports such as swimming and water polo almost always participate barefoot due to the difficulty of swimming with footwear.

Other common activities performed barefoot include yoga, pilates, hiking, running, driving, water skiing, touch rugby, soccer, beach volleyball, surfing, tubing, gymnastics, slacklining, and martial arts. Wrestling can be done barefoot. Although most modern Greco-Roman and WWE wrestlers wear shoes, sumo wrestling, Yağlı güreş (oil or "Turkish" wrestling), and mud wrestling are commonly done while barefoot. Fijian wrestler Jimmy "Superfly" Snuka of the WWE has wrestled barefoot as well. American football is not traditionally a barefoot sport, though several placekickers have preferred to kick barefoot, including Tony Franklin of the Philadelphia Eagles and Rich Karlis of the Denver Broncos. The two schools of thought involved in barefoot placekicking were that the lack of a shoe provided the kicker with a better "feel" for the ball and greater control over its trajectory. The second theory is that shoes and socks absorbed kinetic energy, and kicking flesh-to-leather created more torque.

Hiking
People of all ages all over the world can participate in barefoot hiking, gathering for walks through forest and hiking trails sans footwear. Barefoot hikers claim that they feel a sense of communion with the earth and enjoy the sheer pleasure of feeling more of the world with their feet. There are several clubs throughout North America practicing regular barefoot hikes, including the Barefoot Hikers of Minnesota, Seattle Barefoot Hikers, East Bay Barefoot Hikers, the Barefoot Hikers and Grass Walkers of Greater Kansas City, and the Barefoot Hikers of Connecticut. This is in part also undertaken to be reminiscent of former slaves, who were often forced to remain barefoot at all times (see above). Two sisters, Lucy and Susan Letcher, hiked approximately two-thirds of the  Appalachian Trail barefoot from June 21, 2000, to October 3, 2001. On November 12, 2010, 2,500 people in Mahabubnagar, India, participated in a barefoot walk, which was recognized by Guinness World Records as the world's largest.

In European nations, including Austria, Denmark, France, Germany, Hungary, Switzerland, and the United Kingdom, there are barefoot parks or walks. These parks are kept clean and maintained on a regular basis, so that barefoot hiking can be done in an environment suitable for people who are habitually shod. Barefoot parks usually include a lot of adventure stations, allowing visitors to experience the feeling of soil textures underfoot; to wade through rivers, mud, brooks, or ponds; and to exercise foot gymnastics, balancing, and climbing. The Barfußpfad (barefoot trail) at Bad Sobernheim in Germany attracts over 100,000 visitors annually and has seen approximately 1 million visitors since its inception in 1999.

This concept was first developed in the 19th century by Sebastian Kneipp, one of the founders of the Naturopathic medicine movement. He believed that applying your feet to a range of natural stimuli would have therapeutic benefits. This is related to the ancient practice of reflexology, practiced in China for thousands of years for relaxation and to promote longevity.

Seoul, South Korea, has 158 barefoot parks, allowing people to relax in a natural environment.

Running

Many leisure and competitive runners have been known to run barefoot, including well-known athletes Zola Budd of South Africa and Abebe Bikila of Ethiopia. Todd Ragsdale, of Talent, Oregon, set the world record (pending confirmation by Guinness World Records) for the longest distance run barefoot on June 5, 2010, as part of the Relay for Life fundraiser for the American Cancer Society. He logged , or 413 laps on the South Medford High School track, barefoot. The fastest person to run 100 meters (325 feet) on ice while barefoot is Nico Surings of Eindhoven, Netherlands, who ran that distance in 17.35 seconds on December 8, 2006. Laboratory studies suggest that, due to the lack of extra weight on the feet, the energy cost of running barefoot is reduced by 4%, resulting in lower oxygen consumption. There is evidence that wearing traditional shoes while running leads to heel strike gait that, in turn, leads to higher impact as well as a greater risk of injury. Barefoot running encourages the runner to switch to forefoot strike and may reduce the risk of knee damage.

Barefoot running can be dangerous, especially to runners who do not adequately prepare or give their feet time to adapt to the new style. Many injuries are possible, such as injuries to the Achilles tendon or plantar fascia, or stress fractures in the metatarsal bones or lower leg. Barefoot runners who do not prepare their bodies could provide, "a stimulus plan for podiatrists, orthopedists, and physical therapists".

The official position on barefoot running by the American Podiatric Medical Association states that there is not enough research on the immediate- and long-term benefits of the practice and that individuals should consult a podiatrist with a strong background in sports medicine to make an informed decision on all aspects of their running and training programs.

One alternative to barefoot running is to wear thin-soled shoes with minimal padding, such as moccasins, plimsolls, or huaraches, which result in similar gait to going barefoot but protect the skin and keep dirt and water off. Some modern shoe manufacturers have recently designed footwear to maintain optimum flexibility while providing a minimum amount of protection. Such shoes include the shoes made by Vibram FiveFingers, Vivobarefoot, and Nike's Nike Free shoes. Sales of minimalist running shoes have grown into a  billion industry.

Water skiing

Barefoot skiing originated in Winter Haven, Florida, in 1947, when slalom skier A.G. Hancock tried to step off his ski. The same year, in Cypress Gardens, Florida, competitive skier Richard Downing Pope, Jr., became well known in the sport of barefoot skiing. The first barefoot skiing competition was held three years later, at the 1950 Cypress Gardens Dixie Championships. In 1978, skiers from ten nations competed in the first World Barefoot Championships in Canberra, Australia. The same year, the American Barefoot Club (ABC) was formed, which governs competitive barefoot skiing events in the United States.

Skateboarding
Early skateboarders rode barefoot, preferring foot-to-board contact and emulating surfing moves. The plastic penny board is intended to be ridden barefoot, and Penny Skateboards have promoted the riding of the board barefoot by selling T-shirts and stickers. They have also posted social media posts encouraging barefoot riding, particularly in summer. The Hamboard, a surfboard style board, is also intended to be ridden barefoot.
Barefoot skateboarding has been witnessing a revival in recent times. Many modern skateboarders skate barefoot, especially in summer and in warmer countries like Australia, South Africa, and parts of South America.

Combat sports
It is typically mandatory to compete barefoot in combat sports which allow kicking such as mixed martial arts. In contrast, competitors usually wear shoes in boxing and other disciplines where kicking or similar offensive use of the legs and feet are not permitted.

American football
Until the 1980s, a significant minority of placekickers in American football competed barefoot, although a "barefoot" kicker always wore a shoe on his non-kicking foot. Some kickers believed they could get a better "feel" for the ball and thus have greater control over the ball's trajectory. Another theory was that shoes and socks absorbed kinetic energy, and kicking barefoot would create more torque. A major drawback was the increased risk of injuring the kicking foot (a toe injury in particular had the potential to be season-ending) although the adoption of the "soccer-style" kicking motion starting in the late 1960s (in addition to being proven a much more accurate kicking method) reduced the risk of toe injuries compared to kicking the ball toe-first.

Barefoot kicking decisively fell out of favor during the 1990s as new materials and technology in cleat design enabled shoe manufacturers to develop kicking footwear specifically for American football, based on successful designs of soccer cleats. One design was described as a cross between a soccer cleat and a ballet shoe. As such, nearly all kickers started wearing shoes starting in the 1990s and onwards.

One of the more well known barefoot kickers was Tony Franklin, who played for the Philadelphia Eagles from 1979 – 1983, and finally retiring with the Miami Dolphins in 1988. He remains the all time scoring leader for barefoot kickers with 872 points. The last full-time barefoot kicker in the NFL was Rich Karlis of the Denver Broncos, who played until the 1990 NFL season. The last barefoot field goal was a kick by Jeff Wilkins on October 20, 2002. Wilkins, who only kicked barefoot for the first seven games of the 2002 season, retired after the 2007 season.

Barefoot kickers also occasionally competed in the Canadian Football League, playing the closely related sport of Canadian football, however barefoot kicking was far less common in Canada. Barefoot kickers playing in Canada were typically American players signed by CFL teams, however due to strictly-enforced rules ensuring a minimum number of Canadians on a CFL roster its teams generally endeavor to sign Canadian kickers. Among Canadian kickers, barefoot kicking was never popular since the harsher climate makes kicking a hard leather ball barefoot even more uncomfortable and hazardous compared to doing so in the United States.

See also

 Sole (foot)
 Ötzi
 Barefoot doctor
 Barefoot in the Park (film)
 Colton Harris-Moore (also known as the "Barefoot Bandit")

References

Further reading

External links

 

 
Foot
Human appearance